Serop Zakarian (Armenian: Սերոբ Զաքարեան) was an Armenian politician and the first parliamentary speaker of the First Republic of Armenia. He was speaker from 30 June 1918 until 1 August 1919. During this period, the Prime Minister was Hovhannes Kajaznuni. He was succeeded by Avetik Sahakyan.

Armenian politicians
People of the First Republic of Armenia